Halfaouine - Child of the Terraces  is a Tunisian film made in 1990, the first fiction feature film by the director Ferid Boughedir.

Synopsis 
In Halfaouine, a Tunis neighbourhood, young Noura, finely acted by the director's nephew, is divided between several worlds: that of men in the streets, the women with whom he can still share the hammam (Turkish bath) despite his puberty approaching, and his imagination in which he fears the transition to adult life. Boughedir paints a happy picture of Tunisian life, and illustrates the subtle and complex relationships between men and women in Tunisia.

The boy discovers the pleasures of life as his family adopts a teen girl. The boy tries whenever he has a chance to see her unclothed body. After three or four attempts the boy succeeds.

External links
 

1990 films
1990 comedy-drama films
Tunisian comedy films
1990s Arabic-language films
Tunisian drama films